Leonora is a town in the Goldfields-Esperance region of Western Australia, located  northeast of the state capital, Perth, and  north of the city of Kalgoorlie.

History

The first European explorer to visit the area was John Forrest in 1869. On 21 June 1869 Forrest's party made camp near a conspicuous hill, which Forrest named Mount Leonora, after his six-year-old niece Frances (Fanny) Leonora Hardey.  In 1895, gold was discovered in the area by prospector Edward "Doodah" Sullivan at the Johannesburg lease just north of the current townsite. In the following two years a number of rich finds resulted in rapid development of the area.  The Sons of Gwalia gold mine brought Leonora to the attention of the world.  By 1897 a residential and business area had been established, and the town was gazetted as Leonora.

Leonora had a single track passenger tramway linking the town and nearby Gwalia, from 1901 to 1921. Initially steam driven, the service was electric from November 1908, and petrol powered from 1915.

A reverse osmosis desalination treatment plant was opened in October 2005 to improve the quality of the town's water supply from the Station Creek wellfield by reducing the naturally occurring high levels of salinity, nitrate and hardness. It was designed to supply  of treated water per day.
 
In 2010, the Rudd Government relocated asylum seekers from Christmas Island to the "Leonora Alternative Place of Detention", an immigration detention centre, previously used as a mine workers hostel, in Leonora. The Abbott Government closed the facility in February 2014.

Economy
Leonora is primarily a mining town. There are a number of major gold mines in the shire, as well as the Murrin Murin laterite nickel project. The area supports a significant pastoral industry.

Demographics
At the 2016 census, Leonora had a population of 556, 27.6% of whom were of Aboriginal descent.

Climate
The area has an arid climate (BWh), with very hot summers and cool winters. Frost may occur occasionally on some winter mornings. Rainfall is very sparse.

See also
 Leonora Airport

References

External links

Leonora tramway history

Towns in Western Australia
Mining towns in Western Australia
Shire of Leonora